Bouchardatia neurococca, commonly known as union nut, is a species of small rainforest tree that is endemic to eastern Australia. It has pinnate leaves with three or five narrow elliptical leaflets, white flowers arranged in panicles, and oval follicles.

Description
The leaves are arranged in opposite pairs and pinnate with three or five narrow elliptical to lance-shaped leaves with the narrow end towards the base. The upper surface of the leaves is glossy dark green, the lower surface yellowish green and there are small, hairy domatia.

Taxonomy
The union nut was first formally described in 1858 by Ferdinand von Mueller who gave it the name Euodia neurococca and published the description in Fragmenta phytographiae Australiae. In 1870, Henri Ernest Baillon changed the name to Bouchardatia neurococca in the journal Adansonia.

Distribution and habitat

References

neurococca
Flora of New South Wales
Flora of Queensland
Taxa named by Ferdinand von Mueller
Plants described in 1858